Tracy Looze-Hargreaves (born 16 August 1973 in Bulli, New South Wales) is an athlete from the Netherlands, although she was born in Australia.  She competes in triathlon, and got her Dutch passport by marrying Dutch triathlete Dennis Looze.

Looze competed at the second Olympic triathlon at the 2004 Summer Olympics.  She took twenty-ninth place with a total time of 2:10:35.81.

References
 Profile

1973 births
Living people
Australian female triathletes
Dutch female triathletes
Australian people of Dutch descent
Triathletes at the 2004 Summer Olympics
Olympic triathletes of the Netherlands
People from New South Wales
Dutch people of Australian descent